Santorini Film Festival is an annual film festival organized by HF Productions, held in June in Santorini, an island in the southern Aegean Sea. The festival was first held in June 2018 and takes place annually to promote independent cinema in the area and globally.

The festival 
Santorini Film Festival was first started in June 2018 by HF Productions, and is held annually at the open air screening venue, Cinema Kamari in Santorini.

Santorini Film Festival awards winners

2018
The following are the event winners of the 2018 Santorini Film Festival:
 Best Feature Film: Funny Story (2018), director Michael J. Gallagher
 Best Drama Feature: Nour (2017), director Khalil Dreyfus Zaarour
 Best Director: Gaslighting (2018), director Tina Matzat
 Best Feature Documentary: Calm In Chaos (2017), director Tracey Cochrane
 Best Greek Film: Heimlich (2017), director Kostas Bakouris
 Best Writer: Blind Sighted
 Best Screenplay: Reflections
 Best Short Film: Alone
 Best Short Documentary: Little Fiel (2017), director Irina Patkanian
 Best Music Video: KCPK: The End (2017), director Loïc Andrieu
 Best Music (In a Film): The Astronot (2018), director Tim Cash, composer Pennan Brae
 Best Experimental: Maria's Silence (2017), director Cesare Bedogne
 Best Comedy Short: Fisolofia
 Best Drama Short: De Vlakte (Clearing) (2016), director Margo Mot

2019
The following are the event winners of the 2019 Santorini Film Festival:
 Best Feature Film: Buck Run (2019), director Nick Frangione
 Best Comedy Feature: Love Possibly (2018), directors Che Grant and Michael Boccalini
 Best Director: 安 (Lullaby) (2019), director Ray Du
 Best Feature Documentary: Trace (2019), directors Raluca Bejan and Ioan Cocan
 Best Greek Film: The Surface of Things (2017), director Nancy Biniadaki
 Best Writer: The Greek Passage (2019), writer Lorenzo Guarnieri
 Best Screenplay: Time Police: the Curious Case of the Devil Dogs, writer Scott Simpson
 Best Short Film: Emma (2019), director Abin Abraham
 Best Short Documentary: Neither Roses, Nor Daisies (2019), director Jeunghae Yim
 Best Music Video: Rooftops
 Best Music (In a Film): Petit Four (2019), director Kalainithan Kalaichelvan, composer Kalaisan Kalaichelvan
 Best Experimental: Transient Passengers (2018), director Natalia Hermida
 Best Comedy Short: O.I.
 Best Drama Short: Whoever Was Using This Bed (2016), director Andrew Kotatko
 Best Producer: Cassidy Red (2017), producers Brooks Yang and Matt Knudsen
 Best Cinematographer: One Sunny Day
 Special Mention: Exodus (2018), director Kiran Dhoot
 Best Animation: Two Balloons (2017), director Mark C. Smith
 Best Student Director: Blue Noise (2019), director Jonah Moshammer

References

External links 
 

Film festivals in Greece
June events
Santorini
Annual events in Greece
Greek film awards
Tourist attractions in Greece
Film festivals established in 2018
Tourist attractions in the South Aegean
Events in the South Aegean
2018 establishments in Greece